Dyscophellus is a genus of largely Neotropical butterflies in the family Hesperiidae. The genus has been the subject of recent revisions based on genome analysis. It is currently placed in tribe Phocidini within the subfamily Eudaminae.

Species
Dyscophellus australis Grishin, 2022
Dyscophellus basialbus Grishin, 2022
Dyscophellus damias (Plötz, 1882)
Dyscophellus diaphorus (Mabille & Boullet, 1912)
Dyscophellus doriscus (Hewitson, 1867)
Dyscophellus mielkei Austin, 2008
Dyscophellus porcius (C. & R. Felder, 1862)
Dyscophellus porsena (E. Bell, 1934)
Dyscophellus ramon Evans, 1952
Dyscophellus ramusis (Stoll, [1781])
Dyscophellus sebaldus (Stoll, [1781])

Former species
Dyscophellus erythras (Mabille, 1888), synon. to D. damias.
Dyscophellus euribates (Stoll, [1782]), now Euriphellus euribates.
Dyscophellus marian Evans, 1952, now Euriphellus marian.
Dyscophellus nicephorus (Hewitson, 1876), now Nicephellus nicephorus.
Dyscophellus phraxanor (Hewitson, 1876), now Euriphellus phraxanor.

References

External links
Images representing Dyscophellus  at Consortium for the Barcode of Life

Eudaminae
Hesperiidae of South America
Hesperiidae genera
Taxa named by Frederick DuCane Godman
Taxa named by Osbert Salvin